This is a list of town tramway systems in Germany by Land.  It includes all tram systems, past and present. Cities with currently operating systems, and those systems themselves, are indicated in bold and blue background colored rows. Those tram systems that operated on other than standard gauge track (where known) are indicated in the 'Notes' column.

Baden-Württemberg

Bavaria (Bayern)

Berlin

Brandenburg

Bremen

Hamburg

Hessen

Lower Saxony (Niedersachsen)

Mecklenburg-Western Pomerania (Mecklenburg-Vorpommern)

North Rhine-Westphalia (Nordrhein-Westfalen)

Rhine-Ruhr (Rhein-Ruhr)
Ruhrgebiet (Ruhr Area) towns in geographic order, west to east:Bezirksregierung Düsseldorf (Düsseldorf Region) and Bezirksregierung Arnsberg (Arnsberg Region) towns not tabulated above, in geographic order, west to east:Note for Rheydt: Amalgamated with Mönchengladbach from 29 July 1929 to 31 July 1933, and again from 1 January 1975.Note for Mettmann: Line extended Düsseldorf (Auf der Hardt) – Mettmann (closed 9 December 1936) – Wülfrath (closed 14 May 1938) – Tönisheide (closed 14 May 1938), and Mettmann – Wieden (closed 17 May 1952).

Rhineland-Palatinate (Rheinland-Pfalz)

Saarland

Saxony (Sachsen)

Saxony-Anhalt (Sachsen-Anhalt)

Schleswig-Holstein

Light railway (kleinbahn) operating under tramway (straßenbahn'') concession (from 1952–1953):

Thuringia (Thüringen)

See also
 Trams in Germany
 List of town tramway systems in Europe
 List of tram and light rail transit systems
 List of metro systems
 List of trolleybus systems in Germany

References

Inline citations

Bibliography
Sources, references and external links:
 Books, Periodicals and External Links

Tramways
Germany